Gerald Stanley Krall (April 19, 1927 – June 2, 2019) was an American football halfback and defensive back who played for the Detroit Lions. He played college football at Ohio State University, having previously attended Edward D. Libbey High School.

References

1927 births
2019 deaths
American football halfbacks
Ohio State Buckeyes football players
Detroit Lions players
Players of American football from Ohio
Sportspeople from Toledo, Ohio